Chernino is a rural locality (a village) in Vakhnevskoye Rural Settlement, Nikolsky District, Vologda Oblast, Russia. The population was 137 as of 2002.

Geography 
Chernino is located 40 km northwest of Nikolsk (the district's administrative centre) by road. Yesipovo is the nearest rural locality.

References 

Rural localities in Nikolsky District, Vologda Oblast